Ragnar Gunnarsson (7 December 1891 – 13 March 1967) was a Swedish footballer who played as a forward, known for scoring the first goal in Hammarby IF's history in 1915. He won one cap for the Sweden national football team.

Athletic career

Football

On 15 August 1915, Gunnarsson scored the first ever competitive goal in Hammarby IF's history, in a 5–0 home win against Västerås SK. Earlier the same year, it had merged with local club Klara SK, where Gunnarsson had started his career.

During the first seasons, Hammarby failed to reach the later stages of Svenska Mästerskapet, a cup by then held to decide the Swedish Champions. Known as a prolific goalscorer, Gunnarsson was one of the club's early key players together with goalkeeper Victor Olsson and defender Gösta Wihlborg.

He won one cap for the Swedish football team, on 1 October 1916, playing the whole game in a 0–0 draw against Norway. Gunnarsson left Hammarby at the end of 1918.

Bandy
Like many other footballers at the time, Gunnarsson also played bandy with Hammarby IF between 1915 and 1918.

Works cited

References

External links

1891 births
1967 deaths
Swedish footballers
Swedish bandy players
Association football forwards
Hammarby Fotboll players
Sweden international footballers
Hammarby IF Bandy players
Footballers from Stockholm